James Clarkson may refer to:

 James Clarkson (footballer), head coach of the Houston Dash
 James S. Clarkson (1842–1918), American Republican National Committee chairman
 James A. Clarkson, mathematician
 Buster Clarkson (1915–1989), baseball player